Ann Margaret Harding  (18 May 1958 – 30 January 2023) was an Australian economist and Emeritus Professor at the University of Canberra.

Academic career 
Harding completed a Bachelor of Economics from the University of Sydney. She was a contributor to Business Review magazine in 1980 and then joined the Department of the Parliamentary Library in Canberra as a legislative research specialist in January 1981. In 1982 she was employed as a policy analyst by the Department of Social Security. She graduated with a PhD titled Lifetime income distribution and redistribution in Australia: Applications of a dynamic cohort microsimulation model from the London School of Economics in 1991.

Harding returned to Australia to the University of Canberra where she was appointed Professor of Applied Economics and Social Policy on 12 October 1992, at 34 becoming one of the youngest women professors in Australia. In 1993 she founded and was inaugural Director of the National Centre for Social and Economic Modelling, remaining in that position until 2009, when she moved into a research role. She was made an Emeritus Professor of the University of Canberra in 2014.

Harding's research focused on microsimulation modelling and she was a regular contributor to public policy.

Harding died on 30 January 2023, at the age of 64.

Honours and recognition 
Harding was elected a Fellow of the Academy of the Social Sciences in Australia in 1996. In the 2016 Australia Day Honours she was appointed Officer of the Order of Australia for "distinguished service to education in the field of applied economics and social policy analysis, as an academic, researcher and author, and to professional organisations".

The Ann Harding Conference Centre at the University of Canberra is named in recognition of her contribution to the university.

Selected works

References 

1958 births
2023 deaths
Officers of the Order of Australia
Fellows of the Academy of the Social Sciences in Australia
University of Sydney alumni
Alumni of the London School of Economics
Academic staff of the University of Canberra
Australian economists
Australian women economists